Kantamanto Market is a market area situated in the central business district of Accra, in Ghana. The market consists mostly of the typical Akan tribes of Kwahu's and Ashanti's. It is a well known market in Accra with a specialization in clothing resale. The site was important part of the informal economy of the city. At its peak it was the largest market used clothes market in West Africa.

The site received increasing international attention after sustainable fashion activists and journalists identified the market as one of the main receivers of imported unusable used clothing in the fast fashion industry. Before the COVID-19 pandemic, 40% of the garments that enter the market and are sorted by traders get discarded into landfills. The market and its informal economy play and important role in the city's economy, and COVID-19 restrictions greatly harmed the trade in the city.

A December 2020 fire, which some reports suggest were set by real estate developers, decimated the market. Though some vendors tried to return to the site, developers announced in March 2021 are building a new shopping center at the site.

Market structure
There are over 30,000 traders in the market selling all kinds of wares from used clothing to food to car spare parts.

Fires
Due to the congested nature of the market, when ever there is a fire outbreak the damage is always extensive. With the destruction of good and structures running into several thousands of cedis. There are no fire hydrants in the market making it almost impossible to refill fire tenders which run out of water during fires. This story is similar to other markets in the country such as Kotokoraba market, Market Circle and the Kejetia market. There was fire outbreak in the market occurred on Tuesday, 19 April 2011. Another fire erupted in the market in May 2013.

As the market gets increasing congested, many traders have aired concerns ranging from expansion works to be done, improved fire safety to prevention of ejection.

The OR Foundation found that a fire was deliberately set by real estate development firm set fire to part of the market in December 2020. The fire was part of a long series of fires at markets in Accra. And the site had experienced a fire 10 months before.

Redevelopment 
In March 2021, the real estate developer Golden Coast Developers announced a partnership with Kantamanto Traders Association and the Ministry of Railway as well as the Railway Development.

In culture 
Artist Sel Kofiga documents the cloth trade in the market through upcycling and mixed media art projects.  Samuel Oteng organizes a similar upcycling company.

The OR Foundation and artist/activist Liz Ricketts organized an anti-fashion waste art project called "Dead White Man's Clothes" to examine the waste created by the textile import trade.

References

 

Retail markets in Ghana
Economy of Accra